The Xtracon Chess Open (formerly the Politiken Cup) is an international chess tournament and the main feature event of the annual Copenhagen Chess Festival.

History
Organized by the Copenhagen Chess Federation (KSU), it was originally set up to give Danish players the opportunity of international experience and title norms. Starting from modest means in 1979, with just 22 contestants, it has grown to become one of the world's largest and most respected open chess tournaments, with numbers of participants rising to 200 in 2003, and nowadays reaching well in excess of 400. 

The tournament has attracted many of the world's strongest grandmasters as well as promising youngsters. Former world champion Vassily Smyslov was among the winners in 1980 and 1986, while other notable winners have included Viktor Korchnoi as clear first in 1996 at the age of 65 and Nigel Short in 2006. At the Politiken Cup in 2003, Magnus Carlsen achieved his third and final IM norm.

The early editions were held in Copenhagen and its suburbs, before moving to Helsingør. The tournament has always taken the format of a large "Open", accessible to both titled and non-titled players, except in 1983, when there was an invite-only, all-play-all Grandmaster event and a subsidiary Open tournament aimed at International Master level. 

In later years the tournament has taken place during July/August, over 10 rounds, at the Konventum, a convention centre and resort set in the scenic surroundings of Helsingør. 

From 1979 to 2015, the main sponsor was the Danish daily newspaper Politiken, but  new arrangements have been announced for 2016–2018. The main sponsor is now Xtracon A/S, a Danish IT company with a chess playing owner. Accordingly, the tournament has been renamed to reflect the change, although it is anticipated that the format will remain broadly the same.

List of winners (Politiken Cup)

List of winners (Xtracon Chess Open)

References

External links
 Xtracon Chess Open and Festival Website
 The Konventum Centre
 Chess Results: Politiken Cup 2015
 Chess Results: Xtracon Open 2016

Chess competitions
Festivals in Denmark
1979 in chess
Recurring sporting events established in 1979
1979 establishments in Denmark
Sports competitions in Denmark
Annual events in Denmark
Chess in Denmark